The 1946 Bexley by-election was held on 22 July 1946.  The byelection was held due to the resignation of the incumbent Labour MP, Jennie Adamson, upon nomination as deputy chairman of the Unemployment Assistance Board.  It was won by the Labour candidate Ashley Bramall, with a much reduced majority.

References

Bexley by-election
Bexley by-election
Bexley by-election
Bexley,1946
Bexley,1946
Bexley,1946
Bexley by-election, 1946
Bexley by-election